The Christian is a 1915 British silent  film directed by George Loane Tucker and starring Derwent Hall Caine and Elizabeth Risdon. The film is an adaptation of Hall Caine's 1897 novel  The Christian.  This was the third film of the story, the first The Christian (1911) was made in Australia and the second The Christian (1914) was made in the United States. The Christian was made by the London Film company, which was at the time England's most highly regarded producing organisation and whose policy was to film works of the great authors.

Cast
 Derwent Hall Caine as John Storm
 Elisabeth Risdon as Glory Quayle
 Philip Hewland as Lord Storm
 Bert Wynne as Lord Robert Ure
 Gerald Ames as Francis Drake
 Charles Rock as  Parson Quayle
 Douglas Munro as Canon Wealthy
 Frank Stanmore as  Curate Golightly
 George Bellamy as Father Lamplugh
 Christine Rayne as Polly Love
 Gwynne Herbert as Mrs. Macrae
 Mary Dibley as Mercy (her daughter)

References

Bibliography
 Goble, Alan. The Complete Index to Literary Sources in Film. Walter de Gruyter, 1999.

External links
 

1915 films
1915 drama films
British drama films
British silent feature films
Films based on British novels
Films set in England
Films directed by George Loane Tucker
Films set in the British Empire
Lost British films
British black-and-white films
1915 lost films
Lost drama films
1910s British films
Silent drama films